The knockout stage of the 1998–99 UEFA Champions League began on 3 March 1999 and ended with the final at the Camp Nou in Barcelona on 26 May 1999. The eight teams from each of the six groups in the group stage competed in the knockout stage. For the quarter-finals, each group winner was randomly drawn against the runner-up from another group. The four quarter-final winners were then drawn together for the semi-finals, the winners of which contested the final.

Each quarter-final and semi-final was played over two legs, with each team playing one leg at home; the team that scored the most goals over the two legs qualified for the following round. In the event that the two teams scored the same number of goals over the two legs, the team that scored more goals away from home qualified for the next round; if both teams scored the same number of away goals, matches would go to extra time and then penalties if the teams could not be separated after extra time.

Bracket

Quarter-finals

|}

First leg

Second leg

Dynamo Kyiv won 3–1 on aggregate.

Manchester United won 3–1 on aggregate.

Juventus won 3–2 on aggregate.

Bayern Munich won 6–0 on aggregate.

Semi-finals

|}

First leg

Second leg

Manchester United won 4–3 on aggregate.

Bayern Munich won 4–3 on aggregate.

Final

References

Knockout Stage
1998-99